Elizabeth Wong may refer to:

 Elizabeth Wong (author) (born 1937), writer and former civil servant and politician
 Elizabeth Wong (playwright) (born 1958), American playwright and writer
 Elizabeth Wong (politician) (born 1972), Malaysian politician